The 1920 United States presidential election was the 34th quadrennial presidential election, held on Tuesday, November 2, 1920. In the first election held after the end of World War I and the first election after the ratification of the Nineteenth Amendment (which gave equal votes to men and women), Republican Senator Warren G. Harding of Ohio defeated Democratic Governor James M. Cox of Ohio. Both major-party vice-presidential nominees would later succeed to the Presidency: Calvin Coolidge (Republican) upon Harding's death in 1923 and Franklin D. Roosevelt (Democratic) after defeating Republican President Herbert Hoover in 1932. This was one of only six presidential elections where both major candidates had the same home state, and one of only two such elections where that state was not New York.

Incumbent Democratic President Woodrow Wilson privately hoped for a third term, but party leaders were unwilling to re-nominate the ailing and unpopular incumbent. Former President Theodore Roosevelt had been the front-runner for the Republican nomination, but he died in 1919 without leaving an obvious heir to his progressive legacy. With both Wilson and Roosevelt out of the running, the major parties turned to little-known dark horse candidates from the state of Ohio, a swing state with a large number of electoral votes. Cox won the 1920 Democratic National Convention on the 44th ballot, defeating William Gibbs McAdoo (Wilson's son-in-law), A. Mitchell Palmer, and several other candidates. Harding emerged as a compromise candidate between the conservative and progressive wings of the party, and he clinched his nomination on the tenth ballot of the 1920 Republican National Convention.

The election was dominated by the American social and political environment in the aftermath of World War I, which was marked by a hostile response to certain aspects of Wilson's foreign policy and a massive reaction against the reformist zeal of the Progressive Era. The wartime economic boom had collapsed and the country was deep in a recession. Wilson's advocacy for America's entry into the League of Nations in the face of a return to non-interventionist opinion challenged his effectiveness as president, and overseas there were wars and revolutions. At home, the year 1919 was marked by major strikes in the meatpacking and steel industries and large-scale race riots in Chicago and other cities. Anarchist attacks on Wall Street produced fears of radicals and terrorists. The Irish Catholic and German communities were outraged at Wilson's perceived favoritism of their traditional enemy Great Britain, and his political position was critically weakened after he suffered a stroke in 1919 that left him severely disabled.

Harding all but ignored Cox in the race and essentially campaigned against Wilson by calling for a "return to normalcy". Harding won a landslide victory, sweeping every state outside of the South and becoming the first Republican since the end of Reconstruction to win a former state of the Confederacy, Tennessee. Harding's victory margin of 26.2% in the popular vote remains the largest popular-vote percentage margin in presidential elections since the unopposed re-election of James Monroe in 1820, although subsequent candidates (in 1936, 1964 and 1972) have exceeded his share of the popular vote. Cox won just 34.1% of the popular vote, and Socialist Eugene V. Debs won 3.4%, despite being in prison at the time. It was also the first election in which women had the right to vote in all 48 states, which caused the total popular vote to increase dramatically, from 18.5 million in 1916 to 26.8 million in 1920. Both vice presidential nominees would eventually become president in their own right (which had never happened before or since): Harding died in 1923 and was succeeded by Vice President Calvin Coolidge, while the Democratic vice presidential nominee, Franklin D. Roosevelt, would eventually win an unprecedented four consecutive presidential elections starting in 1932, dying shortly into his fourth term.

Nominations

Republican Party nomination

Other Candidates 

Following the return of former president Theodore Roosevelt to the Republican Party after the previous election, speculation quickly grew as to whether he would make another run for the presidency. Roosevelt's health declined seriously in 1918, however, and he died on January 6, 1919. Attention then turned to the party's unsuccessful 1916 candidate, Charles Evans Hughes, who had narrowly fallen short of defeating Wilson that year, but Hughes remained aloof as to the prospect of another run, and ultimately ruled himself out following the death of his daughter early in 1920.

On June 8, the Republican National Convention met in Chicago. The race was wide open, and soon the convention deadlocked between Major General Leonard Wood and Governor Frank Orren Lowden of Illinois.

Other names placed in nomination included Senators Warren G. Harding from Ohio, Hiram Johnson from California, and Miles Poindexter from Washington, Governor Calvin Coolidge of Massachusetts, philanthropist Herbert Hoover, and Columbia University President Nicholas M. Butler. Senator Robert M. La Follette from Wisconsin was not formally placed in nomination, but received the votes of his state delegation nonetheless. Harding was nominated for president on the tenth ballot, after some delegates shifted their allegiances. The results of the ten ballots were as follows:

Harding's nomination, said to have been secured in negotiations among party bosses in a "smoke-filled room," was engineered by Harry M. Daugherty, Harding's political manager, who became United States Attorney General after his election. Before the convention, Daugherty was quoted as saying, "I don't expect Senator Harding to be nominated on the first, second, or third ballots, but I think we can afford to take chances that about 11 minutes after two, Friday morning of the convention, when 15 or 12 weary men are sitting around a table, someone will say: 'Who will we nominate?' At that decisive time, the friends of Harding will suggest him and we can well afford to abide by the result." Daugherty's prediction described essentially what occurred, but historians Richard C. Bain and Judith H. Parris argue that Daugherty's prediction has been given too much weight in narratives of the convention.

Once the presidential nomination was finally settled, the party bosses and Sen. Harding recommended Wisconsin Sen. Irvine Lenroot to the delegates for the second spot, but the delegates revolted and nominated Coolidge, who was very popular over his handling of the Boston Police Strike from the year before. The Tally:

Source for convention coverage: Richard C. Bain and Judith H. Parris, Convention Decisions and Voting Records (Washington DC: Brookings Institution, 1973), pp. 200–208.

Democratic Party nomination

Other candidates 

It was widely accepted prior to the election that President Woodrow Wilson would not run for a third term, and would certainly not be nominated if he did make an attempt to regain the nomination. While Vice-president Thomas R. Marshall had long held a desire to succeed Wilson, his indecisive handling of the situation around Wilson's illness and incapacity destroyed any credibility he had as a candidate, and in the end he did not formally put himself forward for the nomination.

Although William Gibbs McAdoo (Wilson's son-in-law and former Treasury Secretary) was the strongest candidate, Wilson blocked his nomination in hopes a deadlocked convention would demand that he run for a third term, even though he was seriously ill, physically immobile, and in seclusion at the time. The Democrats, meeting in San Francisco between June 28 and July 6 (the first time a major party held its nominating convention in an urban center on the Pacific coast), nominated another newspaper editor from Ohio, Governor James M. Cox, as their presidential candidate, and 38-year-old Assistant Secretary of the Navy Franklin D. Roosevelt, a fifth cousin of the late president Theodore Roosevelt, for vice-president.

Early favorites for the nomination had included McAdoo and Attorney General Alexander Mitchell Palmer. Others placed in nomination included New York Governor Al Smith, United Kingdom Ambassador John W. Davis, New Jersey Governor Edward I. Edwards, and Oklahoma Senator Robert Latham Owen.

Other candidates

Socialist Party 

Socialist Party candidate Eugene V. Debs was incarcerated at the Atlanta federal penitentiary at the time for advocating non-compliance with the draft during World War I. He received the largest number of popular votes ever received by a Socialist Party candidate in the United States, although not the largest percentage of the popular vote. Debs received double this percentage in the election of 1912. The 1920 election was Debs's fifth and last attempt to become president.

In 1919, members of the Socialist Party who had come from Russian language federation of the party and other more radical groups within the party started to create their own papers and membership dues and cards. These members supported a platform that was similar to the Communist International and elected twelve of their members to the fifteen-member National Executive Committee. However, there was accusations of election irregularities and an Emergency Convention held on August 30, 1919, suspended seven of the party's twelve language federations and expelled the party affiliates in Michigan, Massachusetts, and Ohio. The more radical members of the party held a convention in New York City in June 1919, which was attended by 94 delegates from twenty states. A vote to create a new party was defeated by a vote of 55 to 38 causing 31 delegates to withdraw from the convention. These 31 delegates held their own convention in Chicago on September 1, where they founded the Communist Party USA. The Communist Party USA attempted to give its presidential nomination to Debs, but he declined the nomination.

The Socialist Party held its 1919 convention in Chicago with 140 delegates in attendance. Twenty-six delegates, who were members of the party's left-wing, left the convention. These delegates attempted to unite with the Communist Party USA, but formed the Communist Labor Party of America on September 2, after those attempts failed.

The Socialist Party had 100,000 members before the splits, but it fell to 55,000 members while the Communist Party had 35,000 members and the Communist Labor Party had 10,000 members. The Communist Party claimed to have 60,000 members while the Communist Labor Party claimed to have 30,000 members. The United Communist Party was formed in May 1920 between the Communist Labor Party and some members of the Communist Party. The United Communist Party and the Communist Party united in December 1921 to form the Workers Party of America.

Edward Henry, who was a friend of Debs, Lena Morrow Lewis, and Oscar Ameringer nominated Debs for the party's nomination on May 13, 1920, and the 134 delegates to the national convention voted unanimously to give him the nomination. Kate Richards O'Hare, who was also in prison, was considered for the vice-presidential nomination, but Seymour Stedman was selected by a vote of 106 to 26, which was later made unanimous, in order to have one of the candidates campaign. James H. Maurer was also considered for the vice-presidential nomination, but he declined due to his duties as head of the Pennsylvania Federation of Labor. Debs accepted the presidential nomination in an Atlanta prison on May 29, after being notified by Seymour, James Oneal, and Julius Gerber.

During the campaign the Socialists had four airplanes drop socialist literature over Toledo, Ohio. The wife of Charles Edward Russell claimed that the ghost of Susan B. Anthony told her to vote for Debs. Over 60,000 people donated to the Socialist Party's campaign fund. Gerber predicted that Debs would receive three million votes and that five Socialists would be elected to Congress. Debs received 913,693 votes with his largest amount of support coming from New York. His vote total was over 50% more than what Allan L. Benson had received in the 1916 election. Debs later chose to not run for president in the 1924 election and instead supported Robert M. La Follette.

Farmer-Labor Party

Other Candidates

Prohibition Party

Other Candidates 

Meeting in Lincoln, Nebraska, there was some question whether the Prohibition Party would field an independent ticket as opposed to endorsing either Harding or Cox, but this was predicated on either making a clear statement that they would not move to weaken the Eighteenth Amendment; neither chose to make any such commitment. The ticket favored by most present was that of William Jennings Bryan for president and William "Billy" Sunday for vice president, and indeed when a motion was made to nominate Bryan by acclamation, of the more than two hundred present it was only opposed by six. Upon hearing of his nomination however Bryan declined the gesture, not wishing to remain singularly focused on the prohibition question or to sever his ties with the Democratic Party entirely. Some had considered Billy Sunday a possible substitute but Sunday was "satisfied" with Republican nominee Warren Harding, while others thought about potentially nominating Henry Ford as their standard-bearer. With the nomination thrown wide open, the Party ultimately opted to nominate keynote speaker and Methodist minister Aaron Watkins of Ohio, over other candidates such as 1916 Convention Chair Robert Patton of Illinois, itinerant minister Daniel Poling of Pennsylvania, and Congressman Charles Randall of California. Historian David Leigh Colvin of New York was nominated for the Vice Presidency.

American Party 
James E. Ferguson, a former governor of Texas, announced his candidacy on April 21, 1920, in Temple, Texas, under the badge of "American Party". Ferguson was opposed to Democrats whom he saw as too controlled by elite academic interests as seen when Woodrow Wilson endorsed rival Thomas H. Ball in the gubernatorial primary, and hoped to help the Republicans carry Texas for the first time (Texas never went Republican during Reconstruction). Initially Ferguson and running mate William J. Hough hoped to carry their campaign to other states, but Ferguson was unable to get on the ballot anywhere outside of Texas. Ferguson did manage to gain almost ten percent of the vote in Texas, and won eleven counties in the southeast of the state.

General election

Return to normalcy 

Warren Harding's main campaign slogan was a "return to normalcy", playing upon the weariness of the American public after the social upheaval of the Progressive Era. Additionally, the international responsibilities engendered by the Allied victory in World War I and the Treaty of Versailles proved deeply unpopular, causing a reaction against Wilson, who had pushed especially hard for the latter.

Ethnic issues 

Irish Americans were powerful in the Democratic party, and groups such as Clan na Gael opposed going to war alongside their enemy Britain, especially after the violent suppression of the Easter Rising of 1916. Wilson won them over in 1917 by promising to ask Britain to give Ireland its independence. Wilson had won the presidential election of 1916 with strong support from German-Americans and Irish-Americans, largely because of his slogan "He kept us out of war" and the longstanding American policy of isolationism. At the Paris Peace Conference in 1919, however, he reneged on his commitments to the Irish-American community, who vehemently denounced him. His dilemma was that Britain was his war ally. Events such as the anti-British Black Tom and Kingsland Explosions in 1916 on American soil (in part the result of wartime Irish and German co-ordination) and the Irish anti-conscription crisis of 1918 were all embarrassing to recall in 1920.

Britain had already passed an Irish Home Rule Act in 1914, suspended for the war's duration. However the 1916 Easter Rising in Dublin had led to increased support for the more radical Sinn Féin who in 1919 formed the First Dáil, effectively declaring Ireland independent, sparking the Irish War of Independence. Britain was to pass the Government of Ireland Act in late 1920, by which Ireland would have 2 home-ruled states within the British empire. This satisfied Wilson. The provisions of these were inadequate to the supporters of the Irish Republic, however, which claimed full sovereignty. This position was also supported by many Irish Americans. The American Committee for Relief in Ireland was set up in 1920 to assist victims of the Irish War of Independence of 1919–21. Some Irish-American Senators joined the "irreconcilables" who blocked the ratification of the Treaty of Versailles and United States membership in the League of Nations.

Wilson blamed the Irish Americans and German Americans for the lack of popular support for his unsuccessful campaign to have the United States join the League of Nations, saying, "There is an organized propaganda against the League of Nations and against the treaty proceeding from exactly the same sources that the organized propaganda proceeded from which threatened this country here and there with disloyalty, and I want to say—I cannot say too often—any man who carries a hyphen about with him [i.e., a hyphenated American] carries a dagger that he is ready to plunge into the vitals of this Republic whenever he gets ready."

Of the $5,500,000 raised by supporters of the Irish Republic in the United States in 1919–20, the Dublin parliament (Dáil Éireann) voted in June 1920 to spend $500,000 on the American presidential election. How this money was spent remains unclear. Ironically, the lawyer who had advised the fundraisers was Franklin D. Roosevelt, the losing vice-presidential candidate. In any case, the Irish American city machines sat on their hands during the election, allowing the Republicans to roll up unprecedented landslides in every major city. Many German-American Democrats voted Republican or stayed home, giving the GOP landslides in the rural Midwest.

Campaign 

Wilson had hoped for a "solemn referendum" on the League of Nations, but did not get one. Harding waffled on the League, thereby keeping Idaho Senator William Borah and other Republican "irreconcilables" in line. Cox also hedged. He went to the White House to seek Wilson's blessing and apparently endorsed the League, but—upon discovering its unpopularity among Democrats—revised his position to one that would accept the League only with reservations, particularly on Article Ten, which would require the United States to participate in any war declared by the League (thus taking the same standpoint as Republican Senate leader Henry Cabot Lodge). As reporter Brand Whitlock observed, the League was an issue important in government circles, but rather less so to the electorate. He also noted that the campaign was not waged on issues: "The people, indeed, do not know what ideas Harding or Cox represents; neither do Harding or Cox. Great is democracy." False rumors circulated that Senator Harding had "Negro blood," but this did not greatly hurt Harding's election campaign.

Governor Cox made a whirlwind campaign that took him to rallies, train station speeches, and formal addresses, reaching audiences totaling perhaps two million, whereas Senator Harding relied upon a "Front Porch Campaign" similar to that of William McKinley in 1896. It brought thousands of voters to Marion, Ohio, where Harding spoke from his home. GOP campaign manager Will Hays spent some $8.1 million, nearly four times the money Cox's campaign spent. Hays used national advertising in a major way (with advice from adman Albert Lasker). The theme was Harding's own slogan "America First". Thus the Republican advertisement in Collier's Magazine for October 30, 1920, demanded, "Let's be done with wiggle and wobble." The image presented in the ads was nationalistic, using catch phrases like "absolute control of the United States by the United States," "Independence means independence, now as in 1776," "This country will remain American. Its next President will remain in our own country," and "We decided long ago that we objected to foreign government of our people."

On election night, November 2, 1920, commercial radio broadcast coverage of election returns for the first time. Announcers at KDKA-AM in Pittsburgh read telegraph ticker results over the air as they came in. This single station could be heard over most of the Eastern United States by the small percentage of the population that had radio receivers.

Harding's landslide came from all directions except the South. Irish- and German-American voters who had backed Wilson and peace in 1916 now voted against Wilson and Versailles. "A vote for Harding", said the German-language press, "is a vote against the persecutions suffered by German-Americans during the war". Not one major German-language newspaper supported Governor Cox. Many Irish Americans, bitterly angry at Wilson's refusal to help Ireland at Versailles, simply abstained from voting in the presidential election. This allowed the Republicans to mobilize the ethnic vote, and Harding swept the big cities.

This was the first election in which women from every state were allowed to vote, following the passage of the 19th Amendment to the Constitution in August 1920 (just in time for the general election).

Tennessee's vote for Warren G. Harding marked the first time since the end of Reconstruction that even one of the eleven states of the former Confederacy had voted for a Republican presidential candidate. Tennessee had last been carried by a Republican when Ulysses S. Grant claimed it in 1868.

Even though Cox lost badly, his running mate Franklin D. Roosevelt became a well-known political figure because of his active and energetic campaign. In 1928, he was elected Governor of New York, and in 1932 he was elected president. He remained in power until his death in 1945 as the longest-serving American president in history.

Results 

The total vote for 1920 was roughly 26,750,000, an increase of eight million from 1916. Harding won in all twelve cities with populations above 500,000. Harding won a net vote total of 1,540,000 from the twelve largest cities which was the highest amount for any Republican and fifth highest for any candidate from 1920 to 1948. The Democratic vote was almost exactly the vote from 1916, but the Republican vote nearly doubled, as did the "other" vote. As pointed out earlier, the great increase in the total number of votes is mainly attributable to the passage of the Nineteenth Amendment to the United States Constitution, which gave women the right to vote.

Nearly two-thirds of the counties (1,949) were carried by the Republicans. The Democrats carried only 1,101 counties, a smaller number than Alton Parker had carried in 1904 and consequently the smallest number during the Fourth Party System until that point (Al Smith would carry even fewer in 1928). Not a single county was carried by the Democrats in the Pacific section, where they had carried 76 in 1916. In the Mountain section Cox carried only thirteen counties, seven of them located in New Mexico bordering Texas, whereas Wilson carried all but twenty-one Mountain Section counties in 1916. At least one county was lost in every section in the Union and in every state except South Carolina and Mississippi. Eleven counties in Texas recorded a plurality for Ferguson.

Wilson had won the support of Americans of German, Italian, Irish, or Jewish descent in the 1916 election, but Cox lost in all of those demographics and received less support from Jewish voters than Debs. Harding received support from over 90% of black voters.

The distribution of the county vote accurately represents the overwhelming character of the majority vote. Harding received 60.35 percent of the total vote, the largest percentage in the Fourth Party System, exceeding Franklin D. Roosevelt's in 1932. Although the Democratic share was 34.13 percent, in no section did its voting share sink below 24 percent, and in three sections, the Democrats topped the poll. The Democratic Party was obviously still a significant opposition on national terms, even though Cox won only eleven states and had fewer votes in the electoral college than Parker had won in 1904. More than two-thirds of the Cox vote was in states carried by Harding.

The distribution of the vote by counties, and the study of percentages in sections, states, and counties, seem to show that it was Wilson and foreign policies that received the brunt of attack, not the Democratic Party and the domestic proposals of the period 1896–1914.

Source (Popular Vote): 

Source (Electoral Vote):

Results by state

Close states 
Margin of victory less than 1% (13 electoral votes):
 Kentucky, 0.44% (4,017 votes)

Margin of victory less than 5% (12 electoral votes):
 Tennessee, 3.10% (13,271 votes)

Margin of victory between 5% and 10% (10 electoral votes):
 Oklahoma, 5.50% (26,778 votes)

Tipping point state:
 Rhode Island, 31.19% (52,401 votes)

Statistics 
Counties with Highest Percentage of the Vote (Republican)
 McIntosh County, North Dakota 95.76%
 Leslie County, Kentucky 94.22%
 Sevier County, Tennessee 93.60%
 Sheridan County, North Dakota 92.98%
 Billings County, North Dakota 92.81%

Counties with Highest Percentage of the Vote (Democratic)
 Chester County, South Carolina 100.00%
 Edgefield County, South Carolina 100.00%
 Clarendon County, South Carolina 100.00%
 Bamberg County, South Carolina 100.00%
 Hampton County, South Carolina 100.00%

Counties with Highest Percentage of the Vote (American)
 Austin County, Texas 61.72%
 Fort Bend County, Texas 59.35%
 Lavaca County, Texas 57.76%
 Fayette County, Texas 55.12%
 Washington County, Texas 54.04%

See also 
 History of the United States (1918–1945)
 History of the United States Democratic Party
 History of the United States Republican Party
 Inauguration of Warren G. Harding
 1920 United States House of Representatives elections
 1920 United States Senate elections

Notes

References and further reading 

 
 
 Brake, Robert J. "The porch and the stump: Campaign strategies in the 1920 presidential election." Quarterly Journal of Speech 55.3 (1969): 256–267.
 Burchell, R. A. "Did the Irish and German Voters Desert the Democrats in 1920? A Tentative Statistical Answer" Journal of American Studies 5#2 (1972) pp. 153–164 online
 Daniel, Douglass K. "Ohio Newspapers and the 'Whispering Campaign' of the 1920 Presidential Election." Journalism History 27.4 (2002): 156–164.
 
 
 
 
 
 
 Frederick, Richard G. "The Front Porch Campaign and the Election of Harding." in A Companion to Warren G. Harding, Calvin Coolidge, and Herbert Hoover (2014): 94-111.
 
 Walters, Ryan S. The Jazz Age President: Defending Warren G. Harding (2022) excerpt also online review

Primary sources 
 
 Chester, Edward W  A guide to political platforms (1977) online
 Porter, Kirk H. and Donald Bruce Johnson, eds. National party platforms, 1840–1964 (1965) online 1840–1956
 Eugene V. Debs, A Word to the Workers! New York: New York Call, n.d. [1920]. —Socialist campaign leaflet.

External links 

 Presidential Election of 1920: A Resource Guide from the Library of Congress
 1920 popular vote by counties
 1920 Election Links 

 
Presidency of Warren G. Harding
Warren G. Harding
Calvin Coolidge
Franklin D. Roosevelt
Presidential election